The Smith House is a historic home located on Albany Post Road in Town of Montgomery, Orange County, New York, approximately two miles north of NY 17K and a mile southwest of Walden.  In 1759 one of the town's original settlers, Wilhelm Schmitt (later Anglicized to Smith) built a stone house on the site. His descendants replaced it in 1850 with a Greek Revival-styled house that incorporates some of the original fabric.

It was added to the National Register of Historic Places in 1996.

References

Houses on the National Register of Historic Places in New York (state)
Houses in Orange County, New York
National Register of Historic Places in Orange County, New York
Houses completed in 1850
Greek Revival houses in New York (state)